The 2010 Mosconi Cup, the 17th edition of the annual nine-ball pool competition between teams representing Europe and the United States, took place 9–12 December 2010 at the York Hall in Bethnal Green, London, England.

Team Europe won the Mosconi Cup by defeating Team USA 11–8.


Teams

Results

Thursday, 9 December

Session 1

Friday, 10 December

Session 2

Saturday, 11 December

Session 3

Session 4

Sunday, 12 December

Session 5

Session 6

References

External links
 Official homepage

2010
2010 in cue sports
2010 sports events in London
Sport in the London Borough of Tower Hamlets
2010 in English sport
December 2010 sports events in the United Kingdom